Fury 325 is a steel roller coaster located at Carowinds amusement park in Charlotte, North Carolina. Manufactured by Bolliger & Mabillard, Fury 325 opened to the public on March 28, 2015. Beginning in 2016, Fury 325 has consistently ranked as the world's best steel coaster in the annual Golden Ticket Awards published by Amusement Today.

History

In September 2012, the Charlotte City Council discussed plans for a proposed roller coaster in one of its meetings and it was revealed the ride would cost approximately $30 million. On October 18, January 23, 2014, and June 9, Cedar Fair Entertainment Company, the owners of Carowinds, filed trademark applications for the names Centurion, Fury, and Fury 325. In February, the Centurion trademark was suspended after another trademark application using the same name was found by the United States Patent and Trademark Office. In July, the blueprints for Fury 325 were leaked showing the exact layout of the roller coaster. At the beginning of August, the park sent a beekeeper to deliver a partially burnt bug net with a card saying, "you're gonna need a much bigger net to capture the thrills of the 2015 Carowinds season", to several media outlets in the Charlotte area. On August 12, a microsite on Carowinds' website was found advertising a new ride called Centurion. A similar hoax was conducted by Kings Island leading up to the announcement of Banshee in 2013.

Carowinds officially announced Fury 325 on August 22, 2014, at an event held at the park's Harmony Hall Marketplace. The first piece of track was installed on September 29, 2014. Within the week, the structure for the storage track was erected. By October 22, the majority of the brake run was complete; two days later the final pieces for the section were put into place. By October 26, the base of the lift hill was installed. On December 4, the lift hill and first drop were completed.  On January 30, 2015, the final piece of Fury 325's track was put in place. Fury 325 completed its first test run on March 4, 2015. On March 25, 2015, Carowinds held the coaster's media day.

Ride experience
Once the train is loaded and secured, it dispatches from the station and immediately passes over the transfer track. Afterwards, the train climbs the  chain lift hill. The humming sound of a hornet is played twice on the lift hill, the first after it begins its ascent and the second after a voice reiterates directions to the riders. It then travels through a high speed s-curve, making its way to the park's north entrance. At the top of the horseshoe, the train hits a 91-degree angle before dropping toward the ground and under the entrance pathway. Following a straight section of track, the train goes over a  camelback hill and makes a near-180-degree turn. It then enters a second camelback hill, followed by a left turn into a third camelback hill that ends with the final brake run. The train makes a 180-degree turn as it returns to the station. According to Carowinds, the total ride time is three minutes and 25 seconds.

Characteristics

Track
Due to the ride's height and proximity to Charlotte Douglas International Airport, the park had to receive approval from the Federal Aviation Administration to build the attraction. The track is mostly teal with a lime-green bottom, while the supports are white.

Trains
Fury 325 operates with three open-air, steel and fiberglass trains, each containing eight cars. Each car seats four riders in a single row for a total of 32 riders per train. Every seat has its own lap bar restraint and seat belt. This configuration of trains gives the roller coaster a theoretical capacity of 1,470 riders per hour.

Theme
The roller coaster is themed after a hornet: riders chase their target at high speeds, similar to a hornet. The inspiration came from the American Revolution when Charlotte was "a hornet's nest of rebellion". Despite the teal color of the track matching the teal of the Charlotte Hornets logo, Carowinds did not say if the NBA team had any influence on the final color scheme of the ride. The team's original name had been restored from "Charlotte Bobcats" for the 2014–15 NBA season.

Records
Fury 325 set new records and came close to breaking others when it opened in 2015. Its maximum speed of  ties it with Steel Dragon 2000 for being the fastest among roller coasters with a traditional lift hill. , Fury 325 is the seventh fastest, fifth tallest, and fourth longest roller coaster in the world. In North American rankings, the roller coaster is the tallest, fastest, and longest among non-launched, steel roller coasters.

Fury 325 is also the tallest to be built by Bolliger & Mabillard, following on the heels of the company's first giga coaster, Leviathan at Canada's Wonderland, which opened in 2012.

Reception
Initial reception following the announcement of the ride was positive. Chip Sieczko, a representative from American Coaster Enthusiasts, said, "This is not a Carolina story, this is not a national story. This is an international deal. It's going to be insane." 
Arthur Levine from About.com stated that the roller coaster will make an impression at the front of the park.

Awards
Fury 325 claimed the Best New Ride of 2015 from the 2015 Golden Ticket Awards (GTA), ranking fourth overall among steel coasters. It was voted the best overall steel roller coaster in the same awards publication the following year and has retained the top position ever since.

References

External links

 

Carowinds
Roller coasters operated by Cedar Fair
2015 establishments in the United States
Best New Ride winners
Hypercoasters manufactured by Bolliger & Mabillard